Agrilus australasiae, commonly known as the acacia flat-headed jewel beetle, is a species of beetle in the family Buprestidae, the jewel beetles, native to Australia.  Among species its larvae feed on are 
Acacia dealbata, Acacia decurrens, Acacia parramattensis, Acacia pycnantha and Acacia sophorae.

References

australasiae
Beetles described in 1837